Christo Bezuidenhout is a South African rugby union player for the  in the Currie Cup. His regular position is prop.

Bezuidenhout was named in the  side for the 2021 Currie Cup Premier Division.

References

South African rugby union players
Living people
Rugby union props
Pumas (Currie Cup) players
Griffons (rugby union) players
Year of birth missing (living people)